Cecon may refer to:

 Cecon, a trade name for a Vitamin C drug

People with the surname 
 Andrea Cecon (born 1970), Italian Nordic combined skier
 Federico Cecon (born 1994), Italian ski jumper
 Roberto Cecon (born 1971), Italian ski jumper

See also 
 CECON (Centro de Estudios Conservacionistas, Center for Conservation Studies), a scientific research institute of the San Carlos University of Guatemala

Italian-language surnames